Ypsolopha ephedrella is a moth of the family Ypsolophidae. It is known from Turkmenistan and Kyrghyzstan.

References

Ypsolophidae
Moths of Asia